Dimmi che non passa is Violetta Zironi's debut EP, released after the end of season 7 of the Italian version of The X Factor in 2013.
It features her first single, title track "Dimmi che non passa", four of the cover songs she performed during the TV show and a classic Italian song of the 1940s called "Ma l'amore no", performed with the sole accompaniment of her ukulele.

Track listing

 “Dimmi che non passa” (Christian Lavoro) – 3:21
 “Let Her Go” (Mike Rosenberg) – 3:22
 “Friday I'm in Love” (Robert Smith) – 2:41
 “Le tasche piene di sassi” (Lorenzo Cherubini / Franco Santamecchi) – 3:49
 “Reckoning Song” (Asaf Avidan) – 2:17
 “Ma l’amore no” (Giovanni D’Anzi / Michele Galdieri) – 2:44
 “Dimmi che non passa” (Karaoke version)  – 3:23

Credits
All tracks produced and arranged by Lucio Fabbri, except “Le tasche piene di sassi”, produced by Lucio Fabbri, arranged by Lucio Fabbri and Marco Forni; and "Dimmi che non passa" produced by Michele Canova Iorfida.
All tracks recorded and mixed at Metropolis Recording Studio by Alessandro Marcantoni, except "Dimmi che non passa" recorded at Sunset Sound Studio 3 by Geoff Neal, mixed at Pinaxa Studio by Pino Pischetola.

Reception
The EP peaked at # 13 in the Italian FIMI official chart.

References

External links
 Violetta Zironi Official Facebook Page
 Violetta Zironi Official Twitter Account

2013 debut EPs
Violetta (singer) albums